Constantine Theater in Pawhuska, Oklahoma is the second oldest performing arts center in Oklahoma. The Constantine Theater was built in 1914 and touted as the "Finest Opera House in the Southwest" 

The informal opening of the Constantine in 1914 was the first silent movie in Pawhuska, Neptune’s Daughter, starring Annette Kellerman, and the ticket cost was twenty-five cents.

The Constantine Theatre opened formally on December 22, 1914 with The Prince of Pilsen, done by a cast of 62 brought in from Kansas City.  This play was based on the 1903 Broadway musical, which was later made into a 1926 silent movie. In 1914, patrons came in full evening dress, and ladies were presented with a carnation by Constantine’s daughters, Antigone and Sappho.  Opening night tickets ranged from two dollars to five dollars.

In those days, the Constantine drew crowds for live acts, such as Irving Berlin’s Musical Review and for Osage oil lease sales, which attracted oilmen like Frank Phillips, William G. Skelly and Ernest W. Marland.  Photographs of the lease sales were recently found in a nearby salvage yard, picturing Colonel Walters (then Pawhuska Justice of the Peace) conducting the auction.  

Unfortunately, the great flood of 1915 nearly washed away the downtown area.  But the Constantine survived.  Between 1914 and 1926, it was a major draw for vaudeville acts and touring stage companies.  

Mr. Constantine was the manager of the theatre, and he welcomed high school commencements and religious events as well.  Unfortunately, in 1926 his health was failing (although some thought he might have met hard times financially), and he sold the Constantine to A. M. Abbotts, a gentleman who had previously operated a movie theatre in Stillwater, Oklahoma.  

After 1926, with the new popularity of movies, the stage was replaced with a movie screen, and it was renamed the Kihekah Movie Theatre.  From there, the theatre changed hands several times, and fell into the hands of owners without regard for its ornate design.

The theater, the last indoor movie screen, closed permanently in 1974 and sat empty for 10 years.  The property was acquired by the City of Pawhuska.

Over the following decade, the town suffered a series of economic blows, and lost nearly a third of its population.  Remaining townspeople became demoralized and helplessly watched the town’s historic buildings crumble, some beyond repair.  One person put it this way: “The only thing prospering then was the grass growing through the cracks in the sidewalk.”

In 1984, a small group of Pawhuskans banded together to “change attitudes.”  They set their sights on the Constantine Theatre.

At that time, there were two possible actions to deal with it - tear it down or restore it.  But they couldn’t afford either option.  The only thing that saved it was the fact that it had a common wall with the Chamber of Commerce.

The Pawhuska Downtown Revitalization and Preservation Associate (PDRPA) was formed and assumed the responsibility of the renovation of the Constantine Theatre.  The five member PDRPA board consisted of Bill and Carla McKenzie, Jim Keffer, Mike Pratt and Janet Holcombe who served as Chairman.  

The PDRPA set out to see how many of the town’s buildings they could get accepted by the National Register of Historic Places.  To do so for the Constantine Theatre, they had to remove the outside marquee and the outside ticket booths.  Out of 101 downtown structures, most built after the turn of the century, 88 were accepted.  The Constantine was the 89th.

They also received a tax exempt status, and doors began to open for them.

In 1986, a new effort bloomed to restore downtown Pawhuska, starting with the Constantine Theatre.  In January 1987 restoration began by volunteers and the high school carpentry class.

The restoration of the Constantine Theatre turned into an effort to lift the morale of a town that had been predicted to fade by the next century.  And the restoration of the Constantine has been ongoing ever since.

As Pawhuskan fancy would have it, a ghostly figure, famous for walking backstage at the Constantine Theater, takes credit for breathing new life into the 93 year old Grecian landmark and with it, much of downtown Pawhuska.

An article in the Tulsa World newspaper in September 1987 proclaims “Theater Believed Haunted.  Townspeople say spirit galvanizing efforts to revive business.”

But realists would say a group of Pawhuskans is responsible for revitalizing the Constantine, an ornate theatre characterized by Greek architecture, the inspiration of a preservation effort, extending to 89 of the town’s 101 downtown buildings.

The ghostly consultant was said to be Sappho Constantine Brown, the daughter of oilman Charles A. Constantine, original owner of the theatre.  Sappho, a master of tarot cards and palm reading, dropped in on Janet Holcombe on several occasions at the theatre.

“I was working in the stairs on the foyer one night by myself and I heard what sounded like someone walking on the stage with a hard-soled shoe,” said Holcombe, “and nothing was there.”  Janet Holcombe could be found at all times of the day stripping wallpaper, cleaning, removing false walls, all alone.  She said “I’ve heard footsteps, but I think it’s a friendly ghost.”  In addition, there was recurring mysterious light in Mr. Constantine’s office.

While Charles Constantine and his ghostly daughter vied for billing as the town’s top legend, a group of citizens uncovered their history and the story of the Constantine Theatre. Holcombe, then mayor of Pawhuska, led the restoration effort and served as its chief historian.

Whether or not there was a ghost in the theatre, at least there was spirit in the community!

In August 1987 the local school district offered its vocational carpentry class to start the renovation.  But it seemed unlikely since the school officials required the city to sign a $20,000 contract for construction materials.  But this was Pawhuska!  The money was raised in under three weeks.

The town spoke.  There was clearly massive support for renovating the theatre.

In August 1988, the Constantine building was declared structurally sound by a Tulsa engineering company.  The board agreed that curtains pulled to the side, rather than pulling them up would be best, due to costs and safety issues.

During the next months, a school bus could be seen, parked daily in front of the theater, but most townspeople had no idea of the extent of the work going on inside.

The students were removing waist deep water, floating debris and muck from the theatre’s auditorium.

Rain water had leaked through the roof and the pump had been out of order for years.  Prisoners on loan from Conners Correctional Center  in Hominy worked side by side with the students, draining water from the auditorium and clearing away fallen plaster and scraps of wood.

Greg Spencer, the high school carpentry instructor said “we stripped the place of all its electrical wiring and plumbing and scraped 75 years’ worth of bubble gum from the floor.”

The students installed electrical wiring and plumbing throughout the theatre and began to work on the dressing rooms and foyer.

To raise money for the work, the preservation committee sold most of the theatre’s 89 seats.  Front row seats sold for up to $1000 and seats in the back of the theatre went for as little as $25.

To that point, the committee had raised $70,000 to complete an expected  $300,000 worth of work on the theatre.  A study by an Oklahoma City architectural firm estimated it would take $370,000 to restore the theatre to its original state.

Donors came out of the woodwork from across the Midwest and provided materials and services to help restore the theatre.  A Wichita, Kansas firm offered ceiling fans at half price and a paint store in Tulsa donated 200 gallons of paint.

It was like that the whole way – people coming together to help!

Two California men sent a donation to save the ghost of the Constantine, which made headlines in national scandal sheets.  The money was spent on construction materials.

Currently, the volunteer board of 7 members, has devoted much of its time to uncovering and preserving the Constantine’s Greek detail.

Pre-formed terra cotta segments adorn the theatre’s proscenium with intertwining rope and oak leaves, and rosettes which are actually light sockets.  Two missing segments in the proscenium were cast by a local dentist.

An original pressed tin ceiling of 12-inch square raised panels was restored and painted brick red, one of three colors in the theatre’s original color scheme.

The theatre’s hues - brick red, camel and blue – were found in ceramic tiles in the foyer, and have been spread throughout, along with gold to highlight the proscenium’s detail.

The exterior of the Constantine Theater boasted new detailed masks of comedy and tragedy, handcrafted by Greg Spencer.  The interior is highlighted by a detailed proscenium with balconies on each side.  

In 1991, Kathy Swan, then Secretary of the Constantine Arts Council, had an article printed in Theatre Classics.  She wrote “The Constantine was one man’s dream.  Its rebirth is a sampling of one community’s inspiration, vision, wisdom, courage, generosity of time and money, organization, perseverance, patience, and most importantly, community cooperation and cohesiveness – a rare and beautiful kind of human endeavor.”

References

Buildings and structures in Osage County, Oklahoma
Performing arts centers in Oklahoma